Michael Steinwender (born 4 May 2000) is an Austrian professional footballer who plays as a centre-back for Hartberg.

Career
Steinwender is a product of the youth academies of Baumgarten, Rapid Wien, Mattersburg and AKA Burgenland. He began his senior career with the reserves of Mattersburg in 2017. He made his professional debut with Mattersburg in a 2–0 Austrian Football Bundesliga win over St. Pölten on 20 June 2020. On 19 August 2020, he transferred to St. Pölten, signing a 3-year contract. On 31 August 2021, he moved to Hartberg, again signing a 3-year contract.

International career
Steinwender is a youth international for Austria, having represented the Austria U18s and U19s.

References

External links
 
 OEFB Profile

2000 births
Living people
People from Eisenstadt
Footballers from Burgenland
Austrian footballers
Austria youth international footballers
SV Mattersburg players
SKN St. Pölten players
TSV Hartberg players
Austrian Football Bundesliga players
2. Liga (Austria) players
Austrian Regionalliga players
Association football defenders